Paula Harumi Ishibashi (born February 14, 1985) is a Brazilian rugby union player. She is the current captain of Brazil's women's sevens team and will be leading them at the 2016 Summer Olympics.

Ishibashi was introduced to rugby sevens through friends and has been a veteran of the team for 10 years. In 2013, she was awarded the Athlete of the Year Award by the Brazilian Olympic Committee. In 2015, she also was awarded the best Rugby Player of 2015 by the Brazilian Olympic Committee.

She won a bronze medal at the 2015 Pan American Games as a member of the Brazil women's rugby sevens team.

References

External links 
 

1985 births
Living people
Brazilian female rugby union players
Brazilian female rugby league players
Brazil international rugby sevens players
Brazil women's national rugby league team players
Female rugby sevens players
Rugby sevens players at the 2015 Pan American Games
Pan American Games bronze medalists for Brazil
Rugby sevens players at the 2016 Summer Olympics
Olympic rugby sevens players of Brazil
Pan American Games medalists in rugby sevens
Medalists at the 2015 Pan American Games
Brazil international women's rugby sevens players
Brazilian rugby sevens players